Ground Round Grill & Bar is an American casual dining restaurant that was founded in 1969 by Howard Johnson's. On January 17, 2010, Independent Owners Cooperative, LLC—a group originally formed of 30 franchisee owners, which is based in Freeport, Maine—became the owner of Ground Round.

During the 1970s and 1980s, Ground Round was well known for its children's parties, showing silent movies and cartoons on a big screen, a mascot named Bingo the Clown and for passing out whole peanuts where consumers were not discouraged from dropping the shells on the floor. At its peak, the chain had over 200 restaurant locations The newest incarnation of Ground Round markets to families and also to the adult dining and cocktails crowd with a Sports Bar and Lounge section.

On February 13, 2004 the franchisor for Ground Round filed for Chapter 11 bankruptcy. In the process, all 69 corporate-owned restaurants (almost half of the Ground Rounds then open) abruptly closed their doors.  A group of franchisees joined together in order to buy out the company, at the time Ground Round, Inc., and started the Ground Round Independent Owners Cooperative, LLC (GR IOC).

References

Companies based in Maine
Restaurants in Maine
Economy of the Midwestern United States
Economy of the Northeastern United States
Regional restaurant chains in the United States
Restaurants established in 1969
Restaurant franchises
1969 establishments in Maine
Howard Johnson's